Helena Lindelia (died 1710) was a Swedish textile artist.

She was the daughter and sister of a tailor, and active in Eksjö in Småland from 1682.  After having become a widow, she supported herself by embroidering clerical textiles such as chasubles.  Her work illustrates the religious beliefs of her contemporaries, but uses technique inspired from the Middle Ages.  She is one of few professional woman textile artists known from Sweden in the 17th century.

References

1710 deaths
17th-century Swedish women
17th-century Swedish artists
18th-century Swedish women
18th-century Swedish artists
17th-century women textile artists
17th-century textile artists
18th-century women textile artists
18th-century textile artists
Swedish textile artists
Swedish women artists
People from Eksjö Municipality
Swedish embroiderers